In mathematics, the ind-completion or ind-construction is the process of freely adding filtered colimits to a given category C. The objects in this ind-completed category, denoted Ind(C), are known as direct systems, they are functors from a small filtered category I to C.

The dual concept is the pro-completion, Pro(C).

Definitions

Filtered categories

Direct systems depend on the notion of filtered categories. For example, the category N, whose objects are natural numbers, and with exactly one morphism from n to m whenever , is a filtered category.

Direct systems

A direct system or an ind-object in a category C is defined to be a functor

from a small filtered category I to C. For example, if I is the category N mentioned above, this datum is equivalent to a sequence

of objects in C together with morphisms as displayed.

The ind-completion
Ind-objects in C form a category ind-C.

Two ind-objects
 
and

 determine a functor

Iop x J  Sets,

namely the functor

The set of morphisms between F and G in Ind(C) is defined to be the colimit of this functor in the second variable, followed by the limit in the first variable:

More colloquially, this means that a morphism consists of a collection of maps  for each i, where  is (depending on i) large enough.

Relation between C and Ind(C)

The final category I = {*} consisting of a single object * and only its identity morphism is an example of a filtered category. In particular, any object X in C gives rise to a functor

and therefore to a functor

This functor is, as a direct consequence of the definitions, fully faithful. Therefore Ind(C) can be regarded as a larger category than C.

Conversely, there need not in general be a natural functor

However, if C possesses all filtered colimits (also known as direct limits), then sending an ind-object  (for some filtered category I) to its colimit

does give such a functor, which however is not in general an equivalence. Thus, even if C already has all filtered colimits, Ind(C) is a strictly larger category than C.

Objects in Ind(C) can be thought of as formal direct limits, so that some authors also denote such objects by
 
This notation is due to Pierre Deligne.

Universal property of the ind-completion

The passage from a category C to Ind(C) amounts to freely adding filtered colimits to the category. This is why the construction is also referred to as the ind-completion of C. This is made precise by the following assertion: any functor  taking values in a category D that has all filtered colimits extends to a functor  that is uniquely determined by the requirements that its value on C is the original functor F and such that it preserves all filtered colimits.

Basic properties of ind-categories

Compact objects
Essentially by design of the morphisms in Ind(C), any object X of C is compact when regarded as an object of Ind(C), i.e., the corepresentable functor

preserves filtered colimits. This holds true no matter what C or the object X is, in contrast to the fact that X need not be compact in C. Conversely, any compact object in Ind(C) arises as the image of an object in X.

The ind-completion of the category FinSet of finite sets is the category of all sets. Similarly, if C is the category of finitely generated groups, ind-C is equivalent to the category of all groups.

Recognizing ind-completions

These identifications rely on the following facts: as was mentioned above, any functor  taking values in a category D that has all filtered colimits, has an extension

that preserves filtered colimits. This extension is unique up to equivalence. First, this functor  is essentially surjective if any object in D can be expressed as a filtered colimits of objects of the form  for appropriate objects c in C. Second,  is fully faithful if and only if the original functor F is fully faithful and if F sends arbitrary objects in C to compact objects in D.

Applying these facts to, say, the inclusion functor

the equivalence

expresses the fact that any set is the filtered colimit of finite sets (for example, any set is the union of its finite subsets, which is a filtered system) and moreover, that any finite set is compact when regarded as an object of Set.

The pro-completion
Like other categorical notions and constructions, the ind-completion admits a dual known as the pro-completion: the category Pro(C) is defined in terms of ind-object as

 

from a small  category I.

Examples of pro-categories
While Pro(C) exists for any category C, several special cases are noteworthy because of connections to other mathematical notions.

If C is the category of finite groups, then pro-C is equivalent to the category of profinite groups and continuous homomorphisms between them.
The process of endowing a preordered set with its Alexandrov topology yields an equivalence of the pro-category of the category of finite preordered sets, with the category of spectral topological spaces and quasi-compact morphisms.
Stone duality asserts that the pro-category  of the category of finite sets is equivalent to the category of Stone spaces.
The appearance of topological notions in these pro-categories can be traced to the equivalence, which is itself a special case of Stone duality,

which sends a finite set to the power set (regarded as a finite Boolean algebra).
The duality between pro- and ind-objects and known description of ind-completions also give rise to descriptions of certain opposite categories. For example, such considerations can be used to show that the opposite category of the category of vector spaces (over a fixed field) is equivalent to the category of linearly compact vector spaces and continuous linear maps between them.

Applications

Pro-completions are less prominent than ind-completions, but applications include shape theory. Pro-objects also arise via their connection to pro-representable functors, for example in Grothendieck's Galois theory, and also in Schlessinger's criterion  in deformation theory.

Related notions
Tate objects are a mixture of ind- and pro-objects.

Infinity-categorical variants 

See also

Notes

References

 
 .
 
 
 

 

Functors
Limits (category theory)